Omar Chraïbi (born April 22, 1961 in Casablanca) is a Moroccan filmmaker, producer and screenwriter.

Biography 
Chraïbi was born in Casablanca. He obtained a bachelor's degree in literature in Casablanca in 1984, then studied photography at the Institut Communal des Arts et Décoratifs et Industriels (ICADI). He would go on to obtain a master's degree in communication sciences and techniques at Grenoble in 1986, then a Master of Advanced Study in cinema in Paris, before completing a training course at the FEMIS. He is the brother of Saâd Chraïbi.

He has been the unit production manager of multiple foreign films shot in Morocco, including The Bourne Ultimatum, Green Zone, Body of Lies and Syriana.

Filmography

Feature films 

 2000: L'homme qui brodait des secrets (The Man Who Embroidered Secrets)
 2003: Rahma 
 2007: Tissée de mains et d'étoffe (Woven from Hands and Fabric)

Short films 

 1993: Jeu Fatal (Fatal Game)
 1995: Lumiere (Light)
 1995: Fabula

References

External links 
 

1961 births
Living people